Micrablepharus atticolus is a species of lizard in the family Gymnophthalmidae. It is endemic to Brazil.

References

Micrablepharus
Reptiles of Brazil
Endemic fauna of Brazil
Reptiles described in 1996
Taxa named by Miguel Trefaut Rodrigues